Michael Patrick Leong (born 18 March 1986) is a Solomon Islands former professional tennis player. He played Davis Cup tennis for the combined regional Pacific Oceania team and amassed a team record 19 singles wins.

The most successful tennis player to come out of the Solomon Islands, Leong was the first person from his country to appear at Wimbledon (juniors in 2004) and in 2008 became the only Solomon Islander to be ranked by the ATP. His best ranking was in doubles (536 in the world) and he won two ITF Futures doubles titles.

Leong won the Solomon Islands' only gold medal of the 2007 South Pacific Games, beating Samoa's Juan Langton in the singles final, then in 2010 competed at the Commonwealth Games in Kuala Lumpur, serving as the country's flag bearer in the opening ceremony.

ITF Futures titles

Doubles: (2)

References

External links
 
 
 

1986 births
Living people
Solomon Islands tennis players
Male tennis players
Solomon Islands sportsmen
Tennis players at the 2010 Commonwealth Games
Commonwealth Games competitors for the Solomon Islands